Red Letter Day is an EP by American rock band The Get Up Kids. It was released before their second full-length album Something to Write Home About. It featured James Dewees on the keyboard. Shortly after the album was released, Dewees joined the band full-time.

The album was recorded in 1997 at Red House Studios by Ed Rose, the producer of the band's first EP Woodson. The album was released only on 10" vinyl. The album was printed on black vinyl, save for two limited pressings, 500 translucent green and 500 clear.

Track listing

Additional releases
The entire EP was later combined with the band's other EP Woodson and re-released on one CD entitled The EPs: Red Letter Day and Woodson.
The songs "Forgive and Forget" and "Anne Arbour" were later released on the band's compilation album Eudora.
The song "Anne Arbour" was released as a b-side on the single for the song "Ten Minutes"
The song "Red Letter Day" was featured on the band's second studio album Something to Write Home About
The songs "Mass Pike" and "Red Letter Day" were featured on the band's live album Live! @ the Granada Theater.
The song "Red Letter Day" was featured on the compilation No-Fi Trash released by Suburban Home Records.

Personnel

Band
Matt Pryor: Lead Vocals, Guitar
Jim Suptic: Guitar, Vocals
Rob Pope: Bass
Ryan Pope: Drums
Design
Scott Ritcher - Cover Design
Chris Holland - Cover Design

Additional Musicians
James Dewees: Keyboards, Vocals
Production
Ed Rose - Production

References

The Get Up Kids EPs
1999 EPs